Alister Theodore Fennell (born 1951) is a British jewellery and silverware designer.

Early life 
Fennell was born in 1951 in Egypt. He is the son of Major Alister Ivor Fennell, and his wife, Beryl Ruth Verity Fennell (née Frith). The son of an army family, he spent his early years all over the world.

He was educated at Eton, and then York College of Art, followed by the Byam Shaw School of Art, now part of the University of the Arts London.

Career 
After art school, Fennell's first job was as an apprentice and designer at Edward Barnard, a long-established silversmiths in Hatton Garden. He then went solo in a small studio and workshop opposite Barnard's and in 1982 moved to 177 Fulham Road and a small shop with a studio and workshop attached. In 1997, the company moved to 169 Fulham Road, a  purpose-built building, where it still has its workshops and studio above the showroom gallery.

In 2007, Fennell held an exhibition, Show Off!, at London's Royal Academy of Art, consisting of an array of installations, dioramas, paintings, presentations and sculptures, each showcasing a piece of Fennell's jewellery.

In 2008, Fennell founded The Original Design Partnership, a design consultancy, specialising in jewellery, silver, and curios while also working in other design fields, and mentoring young British designers.

By 2011, Fennell had expanded from jewellery into items such as silver photo frames, cocktail shakers and jugs, with more products in design. In 2011, bespoke items, including the Secret Garden ring with yellow gold, paraiba tourmaline, diamond and enamel were listed at £40,000 or more.

In May 2022, Fennell announced that after 25 years, he was to move from 169 Fulham Road to Chelsea Barracks, as the rent had become "ludicrous".

Customers have included Elton John, Joan Collins, Elizabeth Hurley, Madonna, and Lady Gaga.

Honours
He is a Fellow of the Institute of Professional Goldsmiths (IPG) and an ambassador for The Goldsmiths' Craft and Design Council.

He is a liveryman of the Goldsmiths Company, and an honorary fellow of the University of the Arts London.

Publications
In 2022, his memoir, I Fear for This Boy: Some Chapters of Accidents, was published.

Personal life 
He lives in London with his wife, Louise (née MacGregor), an author.  They have two daughters, Emerald, a writer, actor and director, and Coco, a graphic designer.

References

External links
 Official website

1951 births
Living people
Alumni of the Byam Shaw School of Art
British jewellers
British jewellery designers
People educated at Eton College